Jack Butterfield may refer to:

 Jack Butterfield (ice hockey) (1919–2010), ice hockey administrator
 Jack Butterfield (footballer) (1922–2001), English footballer
 Jack Butterfield (baseball) (1929–1979), American college baseball coach and baseball executive